Charles Houston is the name of:

 Charles Hamilton Houston (1895–1950), American civil rights lawyer and educator
 Charles Snead Houston (1913–2009), American mountaineer, physician, scientist, and Peace Corps worker
 Charles Houston (actor) (1931–2006), British actor in The Valiant (1962 film)